The 32nd Infantry Division "Marche" was a infantry division of the Royal Italian Army during World War II. The Marche was classified as a mountain infantry division, which meant that the division's artillery was moved by pack mules instead of the horse-drawn carriages of line infantry divisions. Italy's real mountain warfare divisions were the six alpine divisions manned by Alpini mountain troops. The division was formed on 22 February 1939 in Conegliano and named for the central Italian region of Marche.

History 
The division's lineage begins with the Brigade "Marche" established in Pesaro on 16 April 1861 with the 55th and 56th infantry regiments.

World War I 
The brigade fought on the Italian front in World War I. On 31 December 1926 the brigade command was disbanded and the brigade's two regiments were transferred to other brigades: the 55th Infantry Regiment "Marche" to the X Infantry Brigade and the 56th Infantry Regiment "Marche" to the XIII Infantry Brigade. On 1 January 1928 the X and XIII infantry brigades switched the two infantry regiments.

On 22 February 1939 the 32nd Infantry Division "Marche" was formed in Conegliano and received on the same date its two namesake infantry regiments. On the same day the 32nd Artillery Regiment "Marche" was reformed in Treviso and assigned to the division. The same year the division's headquarter moved from Conegliano to Mestre, where it was joined by the 56th Infantry Regiment "Marche", which had moved from Cividale del Friuli.

World War II 
In the March 1941 the Marche was assigned to the XVII Army Corps and ordered to move to the Potenza-Eboli-Padula area in the south of Italy. Before the move was completed the Marche was rerouted to Albania for the invasion of Yugoslavia. The division arrived in the Shkodër-Lezhë-Koplik area while the Yugoslav offensive against Albania was underway. However the Marche did not see combat and crossed the border on 20 April 1941 - two days after Yugoslavia had surrendered. The division took control of Dubrovnik, Trebinje, Bileća, Metković, Mostar, and islands of Mljet and Korčula. Afterward, the division was tasked with coastal defence and anti-partisan actions.

The first skirmishes with Yugoslav Partisans occurred in July 1941 near Gacko. On 6 July 1941 Giuseppe Amico assumed command of the division. On 30 July 1941 the Marche, 22nd Infantry Division "Cacciatori delle Alpi" and 48th Infantry Division "Taro" initiated a joint anti-partisan operation between Dragalj and Grahovo in the mountains border region between Montenegro and Herzegovina. In September 1941 the partisan raids on Gacko became so severe that the Marche garrisoned the town permanently. Between 9 October and 9 November 1941 units of the Marche participated in a major anti-partisan operation along the Serbia-Croatia border. Partisans interrupted the Trebinje-Bileća road between 5 and 20 December 1941 and the Marche had to engage in heavy combat to regain control of the route. In the same period, the division repulsed partisan attacks on the city of Dubrovnik and the Gabela-Dubrovnik-Kotor railroad.

From January 1942 to May 1942, the intensity of skirmishes with Yugoslav Partisans in the Bileća-Gacko-Trebinje region increased gradually. In June, 1942, a major mopping-up operation started in the Dobromani-Lastva-Plana, Bileća area. Especially heavy fighting happened at Plana, Bileća, which was initially firmly under Yugoslav Partisan control. Later, the focus of fighting shifted back to the Gabela-Dubrovnik-Kotor railroad.

The Marche participated in the Battle of the Neretva between 20 January and 17 February 1943 and in the Battle of the Sutjeska between May and June 1943. Following the announcement of the armistice of Cassibile on 8 September 1943 General Amico ordered his troops to block the 7th SS Volunteer Mountain Division Prinz Eugen from occupying ​Dubrovnik. Arrested during a parley with the Germans Amico was released on the condition that he would order his men to surrender, but instead he ordered them to attack the Germans. Recaptured by the Germans Amico was summarily shot on 13 September 1943, while many of his men joined the Yugoslav partisans to continue the fight against the Germans.

Organization 

  32 Infantry Division "Marche", in Mestre
 55th Infantry Regiment "Marche", in Treviso
 Command Company
 3x Fusilier battalions
 Support Weapons Company (65/17 infantry support guns)
 Mortar Company (81mm Mod. 35 mortars)
 56th Infantry Regiment "Marche", in Mestre
 Command Company
 3x Fusilier battalions
 Support Weapons Company (65/17 infantry support guns)
 Mortar Company (81mm Mod. 35 mortars)
 32nd Artillery Regiment "Marche", in Treviso
 Command Unit
 I Group (100/17 howitzers)
 II Group (75/27 field guns)
 III Group (75/27 field guns)
 1x Anti-aircraft battery (20/65 Mod. 35 anti-aircraft guns)
 Ammunition and Supply Unit
 XXXII Mortar Battalion (81mm Mod. 35 mortars)
 32nd Anti-tank Company (47/32 anti-tank guns)
 32nd Telegraph and Radio Operators Company
 39th Engineer Company
 2nd Medical Section
 3x Field hospitals
 1x Surgical unit
 4th Supply Section
 142nd Transport Section
 32nd Bakers Section
 33rd Carabinieri Section 
 36th Carabinieri Section
 32nd Field Post Office

Attached:
 49th CC.NN. Legion "San Marco"
 XL CC.NN. Battalion
 XLIX CC.NN. Battalion
 49th CC.NN. Machine Gun Company

CROWCASS 
The names of 29 men attached to the division can be found in the Central Registry of War Criminals and Security Suspects (CROWCASS) set up by the Anglo-American Supreme Headquarters Allied Expeditionary Force in 1945. The names can be found at: Central Registry of War Criminals and Security Suspects from the Kingdom of Italy.

Commanding officers 
The division's commanding officers were:

 Generale di Brigata Quirino Armellini (11 November 1938 – 5 January 1939)	
 Generale di Brigata Fernando Gelich (22 February 1939 - 31 January 1940)
 Generale di Brigata Riccardo Pentimalli (1 February 1940 - 5 July 1941)
 Generale di Divisione Giuseppe Amico (6 July 1941 - 13 September 1943, executed by the Germans)

References 

 

Infantry divisions of Italy in World War II
Military units and formations of Italy in Yugoslavia in World War II
Military units and formations established in 1939
Military units and formations disestablished in 1943